The New Orleans Fire Department provides fire protection and first responder emergency medical services to the city of New Orleans, Louisiana. The department serves 378,715 people living in a  area, including  of water.

History
The NOFD got its start in April 1829 when a group of men organized a volunteer fire department. The volunteer organization was known as the Firemen's Charitable Association, a title that would remain for 62 years until the first paid fire-fighting force, the New Orleans Fire Department, came into existence on December 15, 1891. Chief Engineer Thomas O'Connor, the first leader of the volunteers, stayed on to become the first Chief of the New Orleans Fire Department.

Stations and apparatus 
, below is a complete listing of all fire station and apparatus locations in the city of New Orleans, Louisiana.

Disbanded Fire Companies
Engine 2 - 801 Girod St. - Disbanded 1986
Engine 3 - 1400 S. Broad Ave. - Disbanded 2005 Due to Hurricane Katrina
Engine 5 - 1135 Washington Ave. (Now Supply Shop)
Engine 7 - 1441 St. Peter St. - Disbanded 2013 to form Squad 7
Engine 11 - 2312 Louisiana Ave. - Disbanded 1986
Engine 19 - 2430 S. Carrollton Ave.
Engine 22 - 2041 Egania St. - Disbanded 2005 Due to Hurricane Katrina
Engine 23 - 1135 Washington Ave. - Disbanded 1991 (Now Fire Museum)
Engine 28 - 4131 Elysian Fields Ave. - Disbanded 1986
Engine 30 - 200 N. Alexander St. - Disbanded 1947
Engine 32 - 7311 Chef Menteur Hwy. - Disbanded 1980
Engine 34 - 2312 Louisiana Ave. - Disbanded 1986
Engine 41 - 1400 S. Broad Ave. - Disbanded 1982
Engine 42
Engine 43 - 2041 Egania St. - Disbanded 1976
Engine 44 - 1300 N. Galvez St. - Disbanded 1967
Engine 46
Engine 47 - 7311 Chef Menteur Hwy. - Disbanded 1976
Snorkel 1 - 1040 Poland Ave. - Disbanded 1975
Ladder 1 - 5600 Franklin Ave.
Ladder 2 - 200 S. Robertson St. - Disbanded 2013
Ladder 3 - 4500 Old Gentilly Rd. - Disbanded 2013
Ladder 4 - 1040 Poland Ave. - Disbanded 2013
Ladder 5 - 1211 Arabella St. - Disbanded 2013
Ladder 10 - 2312 Louisiana Ave. - Disbanded 1986
Ladder 12 - 987 Robert E. Lee Blvd.
Ladder 15 - 1040 Poland Ave. - Disbanded 1982
Rescue 1 - 1131 Dumaine St. - Disbanded 1976
Emergency 1 - 1441 St. Peter St. - Disbanded 1980
Flying Squad - 801 Girod St. - Disbanded 2013 to form Rescue 2
Rescue Squad - 1441 St. Peter St. - Disbanded 2013 to form Rescue 7
Salvage 1 - 1300 N. Galvez St. - Disbanded 1986
1st District Chief
7th District Chief

Notable incidents

Hurricane Katrina

Hurricane Katrina made landfall in Louisiana on August 29, 2005.  The effects of Hurricane Katrina in New Orleans included 1,464 deaths, 80% flooding of the city, and many burned buildings.

See also

 Great New Orleans Fire (1788) - The first of two large fires in New Orleans that occurred before the New Orleans Fire Department came into existence. 
 Great New Orleans Fire (1794) - The second large fire.

References

Fire departments in Louisiana
Fire Department
1891 establishments in Louisiana
Organizations established in 1891